Andrey Grishev Novakov, Bulgarian: Андрей Гришев Новаков (born 7 July 1988) is a Bulgarian politician from the GERB political party and a member of the European parliament (MEP) as part of the political group of the European People's Party EPP. He is the youngest Member of the European Parliament and one of the youngest in the history of this institution. 

His work is concentrated in 4 priorities: EU funding instruments and simplification of EU funding; European Fund for Strategic Investments; youth employment (Youth Guarantee); EU Budget and Budgetary control. He is the initiator and creator of the programme for youth entrepreneurship A.L.E.C.O. (Achieving Leadership, Entrepreneurship and Collaboration Opportunities). He takes the place of Tomislav Donchev, who became Vice-Prime Minister in the second government of GERB in Bulgaria. Novakov is a member of the Committee on Regional Development, substitute-member of the Committee on Budgets and the Committee on budgetary control. He is a laureate of the Forbes magazine ranking "30 under 30" for most successful young people in section "Politics".

On June 4, 2015 he was elected co-chair of the Commission on Sustainable Development in the scope of EUROLAT. On October 6, 2015 the European Parliament approves his report "Novakov", as a result of which Bulgaria receives financial assistance amounting to €6,377,000 in order to cope with the consequences of floods and the severe winter in the same year.

Andrey Novakov is also an author of the report for the allocation of €380,000 for technical assistance to the largest EU fund in support of people who have lost their job – the European Globalisation Adjustment Fund.

Biography

Andrey Novakov was born in Pazardzhik, but grew up in the village of Mominia Klisura, where he studied until his seventh grade in the Primary School of St. "Kliment of Ohrid". He completed his secondary education in the Professional High School of Electrotechnics and Automatics (former "Kirov") in Sofia with profile "Power plants, networks and systems". After that Andrey Novakov moved to Blagoevgrad, where he studied in parallel two majors in Southwest University "Neofit Rilski". In 2011 he acquired a bachelor's degree in "Public Administration", where during the course of his education he studied management and management technologies, theory of governance, local governance etc. In 2014 he acquired a master's degree in "Law" and specialized in the field of legal sciences.

In November 2014 he specialized in the United States of America within a program for young leaders from around the world, which included a placement in the US State Department and the Pentagon.

Professional experience

From 2008 to 2011 he was President of the Student Parliament in the faculty of Law and History of Southwest University "Neofit Rilski" where he was re-elected for a second term. Briefly he was a chief editor of the student newspaper "Vestnikat" ("The Newspaper"). In 2011 he was elected a deputy chairman of the largest student organization in Europe - European Democrat Students, and in 2012 he was the only deputy chairman to be re-elected to his post. From 2011 to 2014 he worked as a public relations expert in the municipality of Blagoevgrad, in the team of the Mayor Dr. Atanas Kambitov. Within the municipal administration he worked actively on topics related to media policy of the municipality and its international activities. As a President of the Student Parliament, he became a member of the GERB political party in Blagoevgrad.

He successively held positions as a regional coordinator of Youth GERB - Blagoevgrad, International Secretary of Youth GERB, and before becoming an MEP, he was also a candidate for member of the Bulgarian parliament from the 1st multi-mandate constituency. In his quality of member of the European parliament, Andrey Novakov was elected as a Rapporteur of the European Parliament on topics related to the effectiveness of the internal water transport in Europe, assessment of the multiannual financial framework, assessment of the youth EU Erasmus + programme, etc. He is also a shadow rapporteur on the draft amendment of the EU budget with regards to territorial and social cohesion, and a number of reports on financial aid to enterprises which suffered from the global economic crisis. He works in the field of youth employment, reducing bureaucracy in the absorption of European funds, the "Juncker" plan, as well as topics related to the EU budget. At the end of 2015 the European Parliament adopted a resolution initiated by Mr Novakov to cut red tape in EU funds with a majority of more than 90% of the vote.

Political career
On the Committee on Regional Development, Novakov is focusing mainly on the Programming period 2014–2020. His most important initiative in the Committee of Regional development is the EU funding simplification initiative, adopted in plenary in November 2015. He is also involved in the Multiannual Financial Framework (MFF) revision/ review, How best to harness the potential of small and medium-sized enterprises (SMEs) etc.

On the Committee on Budgets, Novakov's activities are mainly related to the EFSI regulation, Youth employment Initiative, Erasmus + etc. His goal is more investment focused on results in youth employment, innovation and SMEs. Earlier in 2015 the European Parliament adopted with 95% of the votes Novakov's report for disbursement of 16.8 million euro for flooded regions in Bulgaria and Greece. Additionally he worked on dossiers for over 8.6 million euros, allocated to support active employment measures for redundant workers in Italy, Belgium and France. In this capacity Novakov was part of the European Parliament delegation during the 2016 EU budget negotiations. His stance was more funding for Horizon 2020, Erasmus+ and youth employment.

On the Committee on Budgetary Control, Novakov is working for youth employment and for improvement of the current and future investment projects. He was appointed as a rapporteur and a shadow rapporteur in the field of Youth Action Teams, Youth Guarantee, Cost Effectiveness of 7FP and EU Inland Waterways Transport.

In addition to his committee assignments, Novakov is actively taking part in the parliament's delegation to the Euro-Latin American Parliamentary Assembly, where he co-chairs in the Committee on Sustainable Development, the Environment, Energy Policy, Research, Innovation and Technology. He is also a member of the European Internet Forum.

References

Living people
1988 births
GERB MEPs
MEPs for Bulgaria 2014–2019
MEPs for Bulgaria 2019–2024